Kilgariff is a suburb of Alice Springs located in the Northern Territory of Australia about  south of the territory capital of Darwin and about  south of the municipal seat in the Alice Springs central business district. Kilgariff is located within the federal division of Lingiari, the territory electoral division of Braitling and the local government area of the Town of Alice Springs.

History 
Kilgariff is situated in the Arrernte traditional Aboriginal country. 

The suburb's name is derived from Bernie Kilgariff, an Alice Springs resident who served as the first Speaker of the Northern Territory Legislative Assembly at its creation in 1974 and  who was elected in 1975 as one of the first two senators elected to represent the Northern Territory in the Australian Senate.

Geography 
Kilgariff consists of the land bounded by the Stuart Highway to the west, Roger Vale Drive in part to the south and the watercourse of the Todd River to the north-west. The land which was formerly part of the suburb of Connellan was created on 24 July 2013.

References

Notes

Citations

Suburbs of Alice Springs